Jakob Schuh is a German animator, best known for his computer-animated film, Revolting Rhymes Part One & Two for which he received critical acclaim and received an Academy Award nomination for Academy Award for Best Animated Short Film.

Filmography
 2016: Revolting Rhymes Part One & Two (TV Short) 
 2011–2013: The Amazing World of Gumball (TV Series) (titles - 22 episodes) 
 2009: The Gruffalo (TV Short) 
 2007: Ernst im Herbst (Short) 
 2007: Waltraut and Kuno (Short) 
 2007: Room on the Broom (TV Short) (character design consultant)
 2007: Waltraut and Kuno (Short) (character designer) 
 2005: Torvald and the Fir Tree (Short) 
 2004: Strasse der Spezialisten (Short) 
 2002: Bunnies (Short) 
 2001: Celebrity Deathmatch Hits Germany (TV Series) (storyboard artist - 1 episode) 
 1997: The Fearless Four (character posing artist)

Awards and nominations
 Nominated: Academy Award for Best Animated Short Film

References

External links
 

1970s births
Living people
Film directors from Munich